

History

The program was started in 1988 by Akos Tozer, Heath Chantler, Stu Baille and current Rugby Canada CEO Graham Brown. In the program's early years, the team played exhibition games against OUA sides as well as against nearby American Collegiate teams. In 1991, the Lancers were admitted into the Michigan Collegiate League, where they played against teams like Michigan State University, Bowling Green State University, the University of Michigan, and Western Michigan University. In 2000 the team was awarded full varsity status by the University of Windsor and gained entry into the Ontario University Athletics conference. The team lost its varsity status at the end of the 2008 season. In 2009 it restarted as a club team and won the 2010 Detroit Ruck City Tournament.

Year by Year results

 2000-2001: 0-8-0 (Last Place in OUA Conference)
 2001-2002: 0-6-2 (Last Place in OUA Conference)
 2002-2003: 2-4-0 (3rd in OUA Tier II Conference)
 2003-2004: 2-5-1 (4th in OUA Tier II Conference)
 2004-2005: 2-5-0 (4th in OUA West Conference)
 2005-2006: 5-3-0 (3rd in OUA West Conference)
 2006-2007: 1-7-0 (6th in OUA West Conference)
 2007-2008: 3-4-0 (5th in OUA West Conference)
 2008-2009: 1-5-1 (6th in OUA West Conference)

OUA All-Stars

 2001
 Matt Piatek, Inside Centre
 2002
 Andrew Pilkington, Fly Half
 Colin Campbell, Scrum Half
 Matt McCartney, Hooker
 Scott Liebrock, Flanker
 2003
 Steve Piatek, Fullback
 Andy Pilkington, Centre
 Dan Clement, Flanker
 2004
 Steve Piatek, Fullback
 Andrew Ziricino, Fly Half

 2005
 Steve Piatek, Centre
 Matt McCartney, Flanker
 Damon McLachlan, Fullback
 Ian McEwen, #8
 2006
 Andrew Ziricino, Fly Half
 Devin Stubel, Prop
2007
 Andrew Ziricino, Fly Half
 Graham Haigh, Fullback
2008
 Stephen Young, #8
 Kevin Mageto, Flanker

Rivals
 Bowling Green State University (Bowling Green, Ohio)
 Wilfrid Laurier University (Waterloo, Ontario)
 Trent University (Peterborough, Ontario)

Partner Clubs
 Kent Havoc
 Sarnia Saints
 Windsor Rogues
 Brampton Beavers

2008 Roster

Honours

 2 Canada Senior Men's Selections (Steve Piatek (Portugal A, Leicester Tigers) & Devin Stubel (Churchill Cup))
 1 Canada East Selection (Steve Piatek)
 3 Ontario Blues Selections (Steve Piatek, Stephen Young, Devin Stubel)
 1 Canada Under-23 Selection (Devin Stubel)
 2 Canada Under-21 Selections (Steve Piatek and Devin Stubel)
 1 Canada Under-19 Selection (Steve Piatek)
 6 Ontario Age Grade Selections (Steve Piatek, Devin Stubel, Ian McEwen, Bjorn McSorely, Matt Bulloch, Ryan Ivy)
 5 2006 OUA All-star 7's selections (Mark Sheldon, Graham Haigh, Andrew Ziricino, Steve Piatek, Rob Duncan)

Championships
 Truro 7's champions 2006 in Truro, Nova Scotia
 Social Side champions, Sarnia Barn Bowl 2006, 2007 and Tournament champions 2008 in Sarnia, Ontario
 Cross-Border Cup 2008 over the University of Michigan

Rugby union teams in Ontario